Antaeotricha albicilla is a moth in the family Depressariidae. It was described by Philipp Christoph Zeller in 1854. It is found in Venezuela.

References

Moths described in 1854
albicilla
Moths of South America